UTC+05:00 is an identifier for a time offset from UTC of +05:00. This time is used in:

As standard time (year-round)
Principal cities: Tashkent, Ashgabat, Dushanbe, Malé, Yekaterinburg, Martin-de-Viviès, Port-aux-Français, Aktobe, Atyrau, Kyzylorda, Aktau, Islamabad, Karachi

South Asia
Maldives – Time in the Maldives
Pakistan - Time in Pakistan

Central Asia
Kazakhstan - Time in Kazakhstan
The provinces of Aktobe, Atyrau, Kyzylorda, Mangystau and West Kazakhstan
Except all the regions of East Kazakhstan
Tajikistan – Time in Tajikistan
Turkmenistan – Time in Turkmenistan
Uzbekistan – Time in Uzbekistan

Eastern Europe
Russia – Yekaterinburg Time
Volga Federal District
Bashkortostan, Orenburg Oblast and Perm Krai
Ural Federal District
Chelyabinsk Oblast, Khanty-Mansi Autonomous Okrug, Kurgan Oblast, Sverdlovsk Oblast, Tyumen Oblast and Yamalo-Nenets Autonomous Okrug

Antarctica

Southern Ocean
Some bases in Antarctica. See also Time in Antarctica.
Australia
Heard Island and McDonald Islands
Mawson Station
Russia
Vostok Station

Armenia and Azerbaijan used this as daylight saving time (DST) in 1981–2012 and 1981–2016 respectively, called Armenia Summer Time (AMST) and Azerbaijan Summer Time (AZST).

Discrepancies between official UTC+05:00 and geographical UTC+05:00

Areas in UTC+05:00 longitudes using other time zones 
Using UTC+08:00

China
 Parts of western in the country, including western Xinjiang province (Kashgar) (although most locals observe UTC+06:00)

Using UTC+07:00

Russia
 Most parts of Novosibirsk Oblast
 Partly of Tomsk Oblast

Using UTC+06:00

Kyrgyzstan
British Indian Ocean Territory
Russia
 Omsk Oblast
Kazakhstan
Most parts of its territories: 
 Turkistan 
 Karagandy 
 North Kazakhstan 
 Akmola, with its nation's capital Astana

Using UTC+05:45

Nepal
Parts of western in the country, including:
 Sudurpashchim
 mostly part of Karnali
 western part of Lumbini

Using UTC+05:30

Sri Lanka
 India, with parts of its territories:
 Gujarat
 Rajasthan
 Punjab
 Ladakh
 Uttarakhand
 Maharashtra
 Telangana
 Karnataka
 Kerala
 Haryana
 Tamil Nadu
 Himachal Pradesh
 Madhya Pradesh
 Jammu and Kashmir
 Delhi, including nation's capital New Delhi
A smaller parts of Odisha
 Most parts of Uttar Pradesh
 Most parts of Andhra Pradesh
 Southwest of Chhattisgarh

Using UTC+04:30

Afghanistan
 Eastern parts, where the nation's capital Kabul is

Using UTC+03:00

Russia
 The very east of Severny Island with 69°2' E as the easternmost point

Areas outside UTC+05:00 longitudes using UTC+05:00 time

Areas between 82°30' E and 97°30' E ("physical" UTC+06:00) 
Russia
 The very easternmost parts of Ural Federal District

Areas between 52°30' E and 67°30' E ("physical" UTC+04:00) 
Turkmenistan
Kazakhstan
 Aktobe
 Kyzylorda
 parts of Mangystau, Atyrau, and West Kazakhstan
Uzbekistan
 Most parts, including Samarkand
Pakistan
 Western parts, including Karachi
Russia
 Most parts of Ural Federal District

Areas between 37°30' E and 52°30' E ("physical" UTC+03:00) 
Russia
 Western tip of Perm Krai
 Western parts of the Orenburg Oblast

Historical time offsets
Kyrgyzstan adopted this time zone as its standard time from 2 May 1924 to 21 June 1930, and from 31 March 1991 to 12 August 2005.

See also
Pakistan Standard Time
Time in Kazakhstan
Time in Pakistan
Time in Russia
Time in Tajikistan
Time in Uzbekistan

References

External links
 Find cities currently in UTC+05

UTC offsets
Time in Kazakhstan